Humaid Al-Derei (born 16 April 1991 in Meknès) is an Emirati judoka. At the 2012 Summer Olympics, he competed in the Men's 66 kg, but was defeated in the second round.

References

External links
 

Emirati male judoka
Living people
Olympic judoka of the United Arab Emirates
Judoka at the 2012 Summer Olympics
Judoka at the 2010 Asian Games
Asian Games competitors for the United Arab Emirates

1991 births
People from Meknes